Morrow Township is one of ten townships in Adair County, Missouri, United States. As of the 2010 census, its population was 431. It is named for John Morrow, one of Adair County's original judges.

Geography
It contains eight cemeteries: Branstutter, Broyles, Campbell, Cox, Daniels, Megrew, Morelock and Shibleys Point.

The streams of Pleasant Creek, Plum Branch and Turkey Creek run through this township.

References

 USGS Geographic Names Information System (GNIS)

External links
 US-Counties.com
 City-Data.com

Townships in Adair County, Missouri
Kirksville micropolitan area, Missouri
Townships in Missouri